Zuyd University of Applied Sciences is a University of Applied Sciences with campuses in Heerlen, Sittard and Maastricht in the southeastern Netherlands.

The main focus of Zuyd University is on Bachelor programmes, 52 in total, most of them in Dutch. There are currently 8 master programmes.

In the latest edition of the Keuzegids Hoger Onderwijs 2008 ('2008 Higher Education Guide’), Zuyd University takes first place of the 13 larger universities of applied sciences, with an average score of 6.85.

Academics
Zuyd University has the following divisions:

 Economics, Languages, Communication and Hospitality
 Health Care
 Social Studies, Behaviour & Society
 Business economics 
 Arts & Design, Music
 Teacher Training / Education
 Technology and Engineering

Zuyd University of Applied Sciences consists of the following faculties, at three different locations:

See also

 Maastricht University

References
  website Dutch Kengetallen
  website Dutch Kengetallen
  website Dutch Kengetallen
  Website English Sectors
  Website English Sectors
  website Dutch Faculteiten

 
Education in Limburg (Netherlands)
Education in Maastricht
Buildings and structures in Heerlen
Buildings and structures in Maastricht
Buildings and structures in Sittard-Geleen